Two Harbors may refer to a location in the United States:

Two Harbors, California, on Santa Catalina Island
Two Harbors, Minnesota